Pelumutan is a village in the Kecamatan, Kemangkon, Purbalingga, Central Java, Indonesia

This is near Serayu river and Klawing river.

Villages in Central Java